Ken Kirby is a Canadian actor and screenwriter. He has played the recurring characters Ben on Freeform's Good Trouble, Evan Tate in The CW series Dynasty, and Lenjamin McButtons in the LGBTQ web series The Gay and Wondrous Life of Caleb Gallo. Kirby has also appeared in the independent film Straight Up, Fox's The Gifted, and Freeform's Famous in Love.

Early life and education 
Kirby was born in Vancouver to a British father and a Chinese mother. He grew up between Canada, Hong Kong, and Shanghai. Kirby studied business in college.

Kirby, who has a passion for comedy, decided that he wanted to entertain people professionally after 1100 people attended his one-man show at the Vancouver Comedy Festival in 2010. After completing formal training at the Upright Citizens Brigade Theatre and The Groundlings, Kirby entered CBS's Diversity Showcase in 2015 and then signed with The Gersh Agency.

Career
Kirby had a minor speaking role in the 2006 comedy film She's the Man, and voiced Kenji in the video game Need for Speed: Carbon the same year.

In 2016, Kirby played Lenjamin McButtons in the LGBTQ web series The Gay and Wondrous Life of Caleb Gallo, and portrayed Bryan in Freeform's Famous in Love in 2018.

In 2019, Kirby appeared as Byron in Grand Hotel, began playing Ben in Freeform's Good Trouble, and Evan Tate in season three and season four of The CW series Dynasty.

Kirby has also appeared as Craig in the independent film Straight Up (2019), and as Noah in Fox's The Gifted (2018).

Filmography

Television

Film

Video games

Personal life 
Kirby resides in Los Angeles. He hopes to utilize comedy as a way to bring Asian American stories "to the forefront in both TV and film."

References

External links

21st-century Canadian male actors
Canadian male film actors
Canadian male television actors
Living people
Canadian people of Chinese descent
Year of birth missing (living people)